New York City's 4th City Council district is one of 51 districts in the New York City Council. It has been represented by Democrat Keith Powers since 2018, succeeding term-limited fellow Democrat Daniel Garodnick.

Geography
District 4 covers a large swath of Manhattan's Upper East Side, also stretching south to include some or all of Midtown, Times Square, Stuyvesant Town–Peter Cooper Village, Turtle Bay, Murray Hill, and Koreatown. The UN Headquarters, Rockefeller Center, and many other central Manhattan landmarks are located in the district.

The district overlaps with Manhattan Community Boards 5, 6, 8, and 11, and is contained entirely within New York's 12th congressional district. It also overlaps with the 27th, 28th, and 29th districts of the New York State Senate, and with the 67th, 68th, 73rd, 74th, 75th, and 76th districts of the New York State Assembly.

Recent election results

2021

In 2019, voters in New York City approved Ballot Question 1, which implemented ranked-choice voting in all local elections. Under the new system, voters have the option to rank up to five candidates for every local office. Voters whose first-choice candidates fare poorly will have their votes redistributed to other candidates in their ranking until one candidate surpasses the 50 percent threshold. If one candidate surpasses 50 percent in first-choice votes, then ranked-choice tabulations will not occur.

2017

2013

Previous councilmembers
 Murray W. Stand (1920s–1930s)
 Aloysius Maickel (1949–1953)
 Robert Barnes (1953–1965)
 Robert Low (1965–1969)
 Carter Burden (1969 – 1974)
 Theodore S. Weiss (1974–1976)
 Henry T. Berger (1977–1978)
 Ruth Messinger (1978–1989)
 Ronnie Eldridge (1989–1991)
 Carolyn B. Maloney (1992)
 Andrew Sidamon–Eristoff (1993–1999)
 Eva Moskowitz (1999–2005)
 Daniel Garodnick (2005–2017)
 Keith Powers (2018–present)

References

New York City Council districts